Rastislav Ján Lazorík (born 16 April 1973) is a Slovak retired footballer who played as a forward in several Greek teams.

References

1973 births
Living people
Knattspyrnufélag Akureyrar players
Athlitiki Enosi Larissa F.C. players
Association football forwards
FC VSS Košice players
Slovak expatriate footballers
Expatriate footballers in Iceland
Expatriate footballers in Greece
Rastislav Ján Lazorík
FC Baník Prievidza players
1. FC Tatran Prešov players
Atromitos F.C. players
Kavala F.C. players
Levadiakos F.C. players
Anagennisi Karditsa F.C. players
Slovak footballers